Jerry Adler (born 1929) is an American actor and director.

Jerry Adler may also refer to:
Jerry Adler (rock musician), American singer and rock musician
Jerry Adler (harmonica player) (1918–2010)
Jerry Adler (journalist), former senior editor for Newsweek